Blockbusting is a solved combinatorial game introduced in 1987 by Elwyn Berlekamp illustrating a generalisation of overheating.

The analysis of Blockbusting may be used as the basis of a strategy for the combinatorial game of Domineering.

Blockbusting is a partisan game for two players known as Red and Blue (or Right and Left) played on an  strip of squares called "parcels".
Each player, in turn, claims and colors one previously unclaimed parcel until all parcels have been claimed.
At the end, Left's score is the number of pairs of neighboring parcels both of which he has claimed.
Left therefore tries to maximize that number  while Right tries to minimize it.
Adjacent Right-Right pairs do not affect the score.

Although the purpose of the game is to further the study of combinatorial game theory,
Berlekamp provides an interpretation alluding to the practice of blockbusting by real estate agents:
the players may be seen as rival agents buying up all the parcels on a street,
where Left is a segregationist trying to place his clients as neighbors of one another
while Right is an integrationist trying to break them up.

The operation of overheating introduced to analyze Blockbusting was later adapted by Berlekamp and David Wolfe
to warming to analyze the end-game of Go.

References 

Abstract strategy games
Combinatorial game theory
Solved games